Usnea  is a species of beard lichen in the family Parmeliaceae. It was described as a new species in 1925 by Finnish lichenologist Edvard August Vainio. The lichen has a richly branched thallus, and the branches have depressions and foveolae. It is widely distributed in Europe.

References

lapponica
Lichen species
Lichens described in 1925
Lichens of Europe
Taxa named by Edvard August Vainio